The name Onyok has been used in the Philippines by PAGASA in the Western Pacific.

 Typhoon Dujuan (2003) (T0313, 14W, Onyok) – hit near Hong Kong.
 Typhoon Roke (2011) (T1115, 18W, Onyok)
 Tropical Depression 29W (2015) (29W, Onyok)
 Typhoon Mitag (2019) (T1819, 19W, Onyok)

Pacific typhoon set index articles